Daultana,  is a clan of Johiya tribe settled in Punjab, Pakistan.  The members of this tribe are landowners, farmers, politicians, businessmen, government officers.

Notable people
 Mian Mumtaz Daultana,  Chief Minister of Punjab from 1951 to 1953,  and  High Commissioner to the United Kingdom 
 Tehmina Daultana,  former minister and Pakistan Muslim League (N) (PML-N) MNA, Mumtazis  niece.

References

Punjabi tribes
Social groups of Pakistan